The Sulawesi babbler (Pellorneum celebense) is a species of bird in the family Pellorneidae.
It is endemic to Indonesia.

References

Collar, N. J. & Robson, C. 2007. Family Timaliidae (Babblers)  pp. 70 – 291 in; del Hoyo, J., Elliott, A. & Christie, D.A. eds. Handbook of the Birds of the World, Vol. 12. Picathartes to Tits and Chickadees. Lynx Edicions, Barcelona.

Sulawesi babbler
Birds of Sulawesi
Endemic birds of Sulawesi
Sulawesi babbler
Articles containing video clips
Taxonomy articles created by Polbot
Taxobox binomials not recognized by IUCN